Lincoln Place is a street in Dublin, Ireland.

Location
Alongside Nassau Street and Leinster Street South, Lincoln Place runs along the southern boundary of Trinity College Dublin.

History
Lincoln Place, Nassau Street and Leinster Street South were previously collectively known as St Patrick's Well Lane. The name was derived from the holy well on the ground of Trinity College. In John Rocque's map of Dublin in the late 1750s, Lincoln Place was marked as St Patricks Lane. By 1773, the street was called Park Place, and Park Street in 1792. It was renamed Lincoln Place in 1862 by Dublin Corporation as the street was deemed to have a poor reputation. Clerkin states the street was named for Abraham Lincoln.

Architecture
The street has a number of notable buildings, including the Dublin Dental University Hospital and Lincoln Chambers. Two of the street's buildings were mentioned in James Joyce's Ulysses: Sweny's Pharmacy and the Turkish Baths.

See also
List of streets and squares in Dublin

References 

Streets in Dublin (city)